The Eagle, officially known as The Bryan-College Station Eagle, is a daily newspaper based in Bryan, Texas, United States. Centered in Brazos County, the paper covers an eight-county area around Bryan-College Station that includes Texas A&M University. First published by attorney Richard M. Smith as the Weekly Eagle on October 26, 1889, it transitioned to a daily in 1913.

The Eagle has won multiple awards, including Texas Associated Press Managing Editors awards, as well as Newspaper Association of America circulation awards.  The paper's average weekday circulation is 19,132.

The Eagle was owned by the Evening Post Publishing Company from 2001 to 2012, when it was sold to Berkshire Hathaway to become part of its BH Media Group subsidiary. Previously, the newspaper was owned by Belo Corp. from 1995–2001, Worrell Newspapers from 1988–1995, Harte-Hanks Communications from 1962–1988 and local ownership prior to that. As of 2020, Lee Enterprises owns the paper.

References

External links 
 
 

Daily newspapers published in Texas
Brazos County, Texas
College Station, Texas
Publications established in 1889
Companies based in Bryan, Texas
1889 establishments in Texas
Lee Enterprises publications